Ruan GAA is a Gaelic Athletic Association club located in the village of Ruan, County Clare in Ireland.  The club is almost exclusively concerned with the game of hurling.

Major honours
 Clare Senior Hurling Championship (5): 1948, 1951, 1959, 1960, 1962
 Clare Intermediate Hurling Championship (5): 1940, 1948, 1950 (with Dysart), 1978, 2012
 Clare Junior A Hurling Championship (2): 1932, 1948 
 Clare Under-21 A Hurling Championship (3): 1976, 1978, 2021 (with Corofin)
 Clare Minor A Hurling Championship (4): 1938, 1953, 2019 (with Corofin), 2020 (with Corofin)

Noted hurlers
Jimmy Smyth
Cyril Lyons Liam Heffernan

References

External links

GAA Info Profile

Gaelic games clubs in County Clare
Hurling clubs in County Clare